Elections to Tendring District Council were held on 5 May 2007 alongside other local elections across the United Kingdom. The Conservative Party remained the largest party.

Results Summary

Ward results

Alresford

Alton Park

Ardleigh & Little Bromley

Beaumont & Thorpe

Bockings Elm

Bradfield, Wrabness & Wix

Brightlingsea

Bursville

Frinton

Golf Green

Great & Little Oakley

Great Bentley

Hamford

Harwich East

Harwich East Central

Harwich West

Harwich West Central

Haven

Holland & Kirby

Homelands

Lawford

Little Clacton & Weeley

Manningtree, Mistley, Little Bentley & Tendring

Peter Bruff

Pier

Ramsey & Parkeston

Rush Green

St. Bartholomews

St. James

St. Johns

St. Marys

St. Osyth & Point Clear

St. Pauls

Thorrington, Frating, Elmstead & Great Bromley

Walton

References

2007 English local elections
2007